On the border  ( Sahmanin) is an Armenian action drama television series based on the complex and distorted human destinies. The series premiered on Shant TV on December 5, 2015 and comprises 12 episodes. Director was Roman Musheghyan.
The series took place in Armenia and Republic of Artsakh, mainly in Artsakh-Azerbaijani border.

Series overview

Cast and characters

Main Cast 
Ashot Ter-Matevosyan
Rozi Avetisova
Edgar Igityan
David Afrikian
Arman Vardanyan

Recurring Cast

Rudolph Ghevondyan
Artak Aivazyan
Armen Soghoyan
Sargis Grigoryan
Suren Tumasyan
Garik Chepchyan
Khachik Ghazaryan
Hovak Galoyan
Gnel Ulikhanyan
Sepuh Apiyan
Inna Khojamiryan
Hayk Manukyan
Narek Aghababyan
Karen Tjagharyan
Armen Sargsyan
Davit Aghajanyan
Sofya Poghosyan

References

External links
 
 
 In The Army on Armserial
 In The Army on ArmFilm
 In The Army on KKKino.Net

Armenian drama television series
Armenian-language television shows
Azerbaijani-language television shows
2015 Armenian television series debuts
2010s Armenian television series
2016 Armenian television series endings
Shant TV original programming